"I've Got Money" is a song written and recorded by James Brown. It was released as the B-side of Brown's 1962 R&B hit "Three Hearts in a Tangle". It charted on its own, reaching #93 on the Billboard Hot 100. Both songs appeared on the album Tour the U.S.A..

Biographer R.J. Smith describes "I've Got Money" as "one of the less-known great records of Brown's career":

It's a song whose time has yet to arrive, and it's barely a song. It's like a blueprint of some uncanny object. It's an assemblage of parts: a scimitar guitar chord coming down on the One, a show band horn chorus quoting Judy Garland's "The Trolley Song," and [Clayton Fillyau's] stampeding drums. The parts are arranged in a line, one beside the next - an incomprehensible rebus.

Both Smith and Allmusic's Richie Unterberger point to the song as a stylistic precursor to Brown's later funk recordings.

The Crazy World of Arthur Brown covered "I Got Money" on their 1968 self-titled debut album.

References

External links
 AllMusic review

James Brown songs
Songs written by James Brown
1962 singles
1962 songs
Arthur Brown (musician) songs
King Records (United States) singles